Physidae, common name the bladder snails, is a monophyletic taxonomic family of small air-breathing freshwater snails, aquatic pulmonate gastropod molluscs in the superfamily Lymnaeoidea .

Overview
These fresh water snails are present in aquariums and ponds, as well as in wild areas. They are commonly referred to as tadpole snails or pouch snails. They eat algae, diatoms and detritus including dead leaves. The populations are regulated by the abundance of food and space. They are widespread, abundant, and tolerant to pollution.

These snails are common in the North Temperate to Arctic Zones and throughout the Americas, in readily accessible habitats such as ditches, ponds, lakes, small streams, and rivers. The family has been recognized since the 19th century, and yet there has been no classification in which relationships between genera are clarified, no agreement on what characters are primitive or advanced, and no consistent ranking. Scarcity of careful morphological studies is the principal cause. 
The differences in the group have led to the creation of more than 23 genera, four grades and four clades within the family.
The two established subfamilies are divided into seven new tribes including 11 new genera.
Within this family, the shell is always sinistral, in other words it has left-handed coiling. Physidae has 23 genera, 17 occur in Pacific drainages of North and Central America, eight of these restricted to the region. Concentration of primitive genera along the Pacific coast from Mexico to Costa Rica conforms to previous observations that primitive pulmonate families are concentrated within, or along the continental margins of, the Pacific Ocean. An ancestral origin of Physidae along an ancient eastern Pacific coast is probable. From this region the several lineages have spread to north, south and east in the Americas, and through Siberia to Europe.

Ecology
These small snails are quite distinctive, because they have shells that are sinistral, which means that if the  shell is held such that the spire is pointing up and the aperture is facing the observer, then the aperture is on the left-hand side.
The shells of Physidae species have a long and large aperture, a pointed spire, and no operculum. The shells are thin and corneous, and rather transparent. Studies in 1982 indicate that they are most abundant in the New World. They have evidently found a shell morphology suitable for their life station, as he goes on to say "...the physids have undergone considerable diversification, much of which is not clearly exhibited in their shells. Many of the species, and genera, are not easy to identify on shell characters alone."

They have been used in studies of ecophenotypic plasticity, a so-called phenoplastic switch. Burt Vaughan of Washington State University indicates several studies in M. J. West-Eberhardt's recent compendium of research, "Developmental Plasticity & Evolution"  (Oxford Press, 2003, pp. 307–362). A typical example involved rearing Physa gyrina, or Physa heterostropha in controlled pair groups in either water in which crayfish co-existed or water in which only fish co-existed. Within a month, differences in shell morphology appeared; i.e., snails exposed to shell-crushing fish predators showed wide apertures and very much strengthened, rotund shells. Snails exposed to crayfish only showed narrow-apertured, thin elongate shells, with barricading teeth.

In 1921, the strong reaction of Physa to contact with leeches was first observed, and later studies have also been made. The observations are restricted to Physa fontinalis, an indigenous species to areas with indigenous predatory leeches, and Haitia acuta, introduced in Germany and the Netherlands. When Physa contacts another snail, either Physa or some other kind, the reaction is a rapid twisting of the shell back and forth to dislodge the other. The muscle used is the "physid muscle", not found in other Hygrophila, which therefore do not show this reaction. The leech-avoidance reaction carries the action one step further: on contact with a leech the snail twists its shell violently and detaches its foot from the substratum as well.
The reaction of two species of Physids to various species of leeches and to various salts was studied. In Haitia acute, the avoidance reaction was much less pronounced than in Physa fontinalis. The highest percentage of reactions in Physa were obtained with the two species of leeches that feed chiefly on snails. The nature of the substance that produces the reaction is undetermined, but presumably it is a protein.

Taxonomy
According to ITIS and WoRMS, this family is classified into 4 genera, although the 4 genera from each database has a little bit difference.  The classification from the taxonomy by Bouchet & Rocroi (2005), which is based on classification by Taylor (2003): Taylor classifies Physidae according to the anatomical differences of their penis, the differences among the penial complex, penial sheath and preputium.  Thus, the Physidae is classified into two subfamilies, four grades and seven tribes. This classification with tribes is no longer used by WoRMS.

subfamily Physinae Fitzinger, 1833: Preputial gland present
 tribe Haitiini  D.W. Taylor, 2003
 tribe Physini Fitzinger, 1833
 tribe Physellini D. W. Taylor, 2003
subfamily Aplexinae Starobogatov, 1967: Preputial gland absent
 tribe Aplexini Starobogatov, 1967
 tribe Amecanautini D. W. Taylor, 2003
 tribe Austrinautini D. W. Taylor, 2003
 tribe Stenophysini D. W. Taylor, 2003

Genera in the family Physidae include
 † Berellaia De Laubrière & Carez, 1881 †
 † Hannibalina Hanna & Gester, 1963 †
 † Prophysa Bandel, 1991

subfamily Aplexinae
Aplexini
 Amuraplexa Starobotatov, Prozorova & Zatravkin, 1989
 Aplexa Fleming, 1820 - aplexa, type genus of the subfamily Aplexinae
 Paraplexa Starobogatov, 1989
 Sibirenauta Starobogatov & Streletzkaja, 1967

Amecanautini
 Amecanauta D. W. Taylor, 2003 - type genus of the tribe Amecanautini
 Mayabina Taylor, 2003
 Mexinauta Taylor, 2003
 Tropinauta Taylor, 2003

Austrinautini
 Austrinauta D. W. Taylor, 2003 - type genus of the tribe Austrinautini
 Caribnauta Taylor, 2003

Stenophysini
 Afrophysa Starobogatov, 1967
 Stenophysa von Martens, 1898 - type genus of the tribe Stenophysini

subfamily Physinae
Haitiini
 Haitia Clench & Aguayo, 1932 - type genus of the tribe Haitiini

Physini
 Beringophysa Starobogatov & Budnikova, 1976
 Laurentiphysa Taylor, 2003
 Physa Draparnaud, 1801 - type genus of the family Physidae

Physellini
 Archiphysa Taylor, 2003
 Chiapaphysa Taylor, 2003
 Petrophysa Pilsbry, 1926 
 Physella Haldemann, 1843 - type genus of the tribe Physellini
 Ultraphysella Taylor, 2003
 Utahphysa Taylor, 2003

Genera brought into synonymy
 Aplecta Herrmannsen, 1846: synonym of Aplexa J. Fleming, 1820 (invalid: an incorrect subsequent spelling of Aplexa)
 Archiphysa D. W. Taylor, 2003: synonym of Physella Haldeman, 1842 (a junior synonym)
 Costatella Dall, 1870: synonym of Physella (Costatella) Dall, 1870 represented as Physella Haldeman, 1842
 Haitia Clench & Aguayo, 1932: synonym of Physella (Acutiana) Fagot, 1883 represented as Physella Haldeman, 1842
 Laurentiphysa Taylor, 2003: synonym of Physa Draparnaud, 1801 (a junior synonym)
 Rivicola Fitzinger, 1833: synonym of Physa Draparnaud, 1801 (Invalid: junior objective synonym of Physa, with the same type species)

Aquarium use
Physid snails are often introduced to an aquarium accidentally as eggs on aquatic plants. These snails are sometimes viewed as pests in aquarium tanks with fish, because the snails create waste, reproduce very often, and are very hard to remove completely. However, some aquarium owners deliberately chose to add these freshwater pond snails to their tank because the snails will eat uneaten fish food, algae and waste, as well as unwanted fish carcasses.

References

 Haas, F. (1952). On the mollusk fauna of the landlocked waters of Bermuda. Fieldiana: Zoology, 34(8): 101-105
 Janus, Horst, 1965. The young specialist looks at land and freshwater molluscs, Burke, London
 Naranjo-García, E. & Appleton, C.C. 2009. The architecture of the physid musculature of Physa acuta Draparnaud, 1805 (Gastropoda: Physidae). African Invertebrates 50 (1): 1-11. Abstract

Further reading 
 Wethington A. R. & Lydeard C. (2007). "A molecular phylogeny of Physidae (Gastropoda: Basommatophora) based on mitochondrial DNA sequences". Journal of Molluscan Studies 73(3): 241–257. .

External links

 Physidae